"Oh No" is a song by German pop group Bro'Sis. It was written by Marc Mozart and Andy Love and produced by the former along with John Eaton for the band's second studio album Days of Our Lives (2003). Released as the album's lead single on 7 April 2003 on double A-side with their German Football Association hymn "Never Stop", the latin pop-influenced uptempo track became the group's sixth and final top ten entry on the German Singles Chart, peaking at number seven. It also marked the band's final release with Indira Weis who would announce her departure from Bro'Sis the following month.

Formats and track listings

Credits and personnel

 Ross Antony – vocals
 Hila Bronstein – vocals
 John Eaton – production, recording
 Nik Hafeman – recording
 Shaham Joyce – vocals

 Faiz Mangat – vocals
 Marc Mozart – production, mixing, recording
 Indira Weis – vocals
 Giovanni Zarrella – vocals

Charts

Weekly charts

Year-end charts

References

2003 songs
Bro'Sis songs
Polydor Records singles